Let's Rhumba was an American Latin dance instruction program that aired on NBC from November 15, 1946, to January 17, 1947. Each 15-minute episode was hosted by D'Avalos. No episodes are known to survive as NBC had no archival policy at the time.

References

External links
 

1946 American television series debuts
1947 American television series endings
Black-and-white American television shows
Dance television shows
English-language television shows
Lost television shows
NBC original programming